
The St. James Theatre (1912–1929) of Boston, Massachusetts, was a playhouse and  cinema in the Back Bay in the 1910s and 1920s. It occupied the former Chickering Hall on Huntington Avenue near Massachusetts Avenue, adjacent to Horticultural Hall. For some years Loew's theatre chain oversaw the St. James. In 1929 the theatre "became part of the Publix (Paramount) chain, and was renamed the Uptown."

Images

References

Further reading
 "The St. James Theater and its Founder." New England Magazine, v.48, no.2, Oct. 1912

External links

 Library of Congress. Keith-Albee St. James Theatre, (Boston Player Stock Company), Huntington Ave. near Massachusetts Ave., Boston, Massachusetts. Drawing of theater facade, 1928.
 Boston Public Library.Postcard of St. James Theatre, Boston, Mass., published by Mason Bros. & Co., ca. 1915-1930
 Bostonian Society. Photograph of Uptown Theater, 239 Huntington Street, ca. 1962-1963. "Demolition (replaced by Christian Science Center). Originally the Chickering Hall (built 1900-1901), later Saint James Theater."
 CinemaTreasures.org. Uptown Theatre, 239 Huntington Avenue, Boston, MA 02115 (successor to the St. James)

Back Bay, Boston
Former buildings and structures in Boston
1912 establishments in Massachusetts
1929 disestablishments in Massachusetts
Cultural history of Boston
20th century in Boston
Former cinemas in the United States
Former theatres in Boston
Event venues established in 1912
Loew's Theatres buildings and structures